Love All Serve All is the second studio album by Japanese singer-songwriter Fujii Kaze. It was released on March 23, 2022, through Universal Sigma. Six singles were released prior to the album, those being "Matsuri", "Hedemo Ne-Yo", "Seishun Sick", "Tabiji", "Mo-Eh-Yo", and "Kirari". "Kirari" was used in commercials to promote the Honda Vezel. The first edition of the album was released alongside an album of covers titled Love All Cover All. Love All Serve All peaked atop both the Oricon Albums Chart and the Combined Chart. It was certified platinum by the RIAJ. It won the red award at the 2023 CD Shop Awards.

Track listing

Regular edition

Limited edition and digital release bonus 
Included as a bonus disc with the limited edition as well as with the digital version.

Charts

Weekly charts

Monthly charts

Year-end charts

References 

2022 albums
Japanese-language albums
Fujii Kaze albums
Universal Sigma albums